Veit Arnpeck (Freising, ca. 1440 – Landshut 1496) was a Bavarian historian. He was educated at Amberg and Vienna and later became parish priest of St. Martin's Church, Landshut and chaplain to Bishop Sixtus. He is considered a significant figure in the development of Bavarian historiography and was praised by Johannes Aventinus (Aventin) as one of his most important predecessors. His works include Chronicon Austriacum down to 1488 (Pez, Script. rer. Austr., I, 1165), Liber de gestis episcoporum Frisingensium (Deutinger, Beitr. z. Gesch. d. Erzbisth. Munch.-Fries., III), and the Chronicon Baioariorum (Pez, Thesaurus, III, ii, 19 sq.).

Arnpeck died early 1496 in Landshut, and with reasonable certainty the cause of death was the plague.

References

Attribution

1440 births
1505 deaths
15th-century German historians
15th-century German Roman Catholic priests
German male non-fiction writers